The 1988–89 Connecticut Huskies men's basketball team represented the University of Connecticut in the 1988–89 collegiate men's basketball season. The Huskies completed the season with an 18–13 overall record. The Huskies were members of the Big East Conference where they finished with a 6–10 record. They made it to the quarterfinals in the 1989 National Invitation Tournament. The Huskies played their home games at Hugh S. Greer Field House in Storrs, Connecticut and the Hartford Civic Center in Hartford, Connecticut, and they were led by third-year head coach Jim Calhoun.

Schedule 

|-
!colspan=12 style=""| Regular Season

|-
!colspan=12 style=""| Big East tournament

|-
!colspan=12 style=""| NIT

Schedule Source:

References 

UConn Huskies men's basketball seasons
Connecticut Huskies
Connecticut Huskies
1988 in sports in Connecticut
1989 in sports in Connecticut